The politics of Shanxi Province in the People's Republic of China is structured in a dual party-government system like all other governing institutions in mainland China. 

The Governor of Shanxi (山西省长) is the highest-ranking official in the People's Government of Shanxi. However, in the province's dual party-government governing system, the Governor has less power than the Shanxi Chinese Communist Party (CCP) Provincial Committee Secretary (山西省委书记), colloquially termed the "Shanxi CCP Party Chief".

Chinese Communist Party

List of party secretaries
Secretaries of the CCP Shanxi Committee:
Cheng Zihua (程子华): 1949–1950
Lai Ruoyu (赖若愚): 1950–1952
Xie Xuegong (解学恭): 1952 (acting)
Gao Kelin (高克林): 1952
Tao Lujia (陶鲁笳): 1952.12–1965
Wei Heng (卫恒): 1965–1967
Liu Geping (刘格平): 1967–1971
Xie Zhenhua (谢振华): 1971–1975
Wang Qian (王谦): 1975–1980
Huo Shilian (霍士廉): 1980–1983
Li Ligong (李立功): 1983–1991
Wang Maolin (王茂林): 1991–1993
Hu Fuguo (胡富国): 1993–1999
Tian Chengping (田成平): 1999–2005
Zhang Baoshun (张宝顺): 2005–2010
Yuan Chunqing (袁纯清): 2010–2014
Wang Rulin (王儒林): 2014 – 2016
Luo Huining (骆惠宁): 2016 – 2019
Lou Yangsheng (骆惠宁): 2019 – 2021
Lin Wu (林武): 2021 – present

List of governors of Shanxi
Cheng Zihua (程子华): 1949–1951
Pei Lisheng (裴丽生): 1950–1951
Lai Ruoyu (赖若愚): 1951–1952
Pei Lisheng (裴丽生): 1952–1956
Wang Shiying (王世英): 1956–1958
Wei Heng (卫恒): 1958–1965
Wang Qian (王谦): 1965–1967
Liu Geping (刘格平): 1967–1971
Xie Zhenhua (谢振华): 1971–1975
Wang Qian (王谦): 1975–1979
Luo Guibo (罗贵波): 1979–1983
Wang Senhao (王森浩): 1983–1992
Hu Fuguo (胡富国): 1992–1993
Sun Wensheng (孙文盛): 1993–1999
Liu Zhenhua (刘振华): 1999–2004
Zhang Baoshun (张宝顺): 2004–2005
Yu Youjun (于幼军): 2005–2007
Meng Xuenong (孟学农): 2007.09–2008.09
Wang Jun (王君): 2008.09–2012.12
Li Xiaopeng (李小鹏): 2012.12 – 2016
Lou Yangsheng (楼阳生): 2016 – 2019
Lin Wu (林武): 2019 – 2021
Lan Foan (蓝佛安): 2021 - present

List of chairmen of Shanxi People's Congress
Ruan Posheng (阮泊生): 1979–1988
Wang Tingdong (王庭栋): 1988–1993
Lu Gongxun (卢功勋): 1993–2003
Tian Chengping (田成平): 2003–2005
Zhang Baoshun (张宝顺): 2006–2010
Yuan Chunqing (袁纯清): 2010–2014
Wang Rulin (王儒林): 2014 – 2016
Luo Huining (骆惠宁): 2016 – 2019
Lou Yangsheng (骆惠宁): 2019 – 2021
Lin Wu (林武): 2021 – present

List of chairmen of CPPCC Shanxi Committee
Tao Lujia (陶鲁笳): 1955–1965
Wei Heng (卫恒): 1965–1967
Wang Qian (王谦): 1977–1979
Zheng Lin (郑林): 1979–1983
Wu Guangtang (武光汤): 1983–1985
Li Xiuren (李修仁): 1985–1993
Wang Maolin (王茂林): 1993
Hu Fuguo (胡富国): 1994–1995
Guo Yuhuai (郭裕怀): 1995–2000
Tian Chengping (田成平): 2000–2001
Zheng Shekui (郑社奎): 2001–2003
Liu Zemin (刘泽民): 2003–2008
Jin Yinhuan (金银焕): 2008 (died in office)
Xue Yanzhong (薛延忠): 2009–2018
Huang Xiaowei (黄晓薇): 2018
Li Jia (李佳): 2018–present

Shanxi
Shanxi